The Toyota Celica Twin-Cam Turbo is a racing car produced to compete in rally racing in Group B, presented by Toyota in 1983 and used until the abolition of Group B at the end of 1986.

The Celica TCT proved to be one of the best-used cars in African rallies, winning both the Safari Rally and the Ivory Coast Rally on three occasions, earning the nickname King of Africa.

Features
The main rules for racing in Group B were to produce at least 200 road cars and Toyota working with its European division put precisely the number that provided for the regulation by building even twenty rally cars with a new engine.

While some rival teams such as the Audi Quattro adopted all-wheel drive, the Celica, such as the Lancia 037 Rally, had rear-wheel drive.

The car debuted in the 1983 World Rally Championship at the 1000 Lakes Rally with driver Juha Kankkunen finishing sixth overall. In the same year, he achieved the first of three victories in the Ivory Coast Rally, led by Björn Waldegård.

In 1984, the Swedish driver Waldegård also finished first overall at the Safari Rally, giving the first of three consecutive victories to the Toyota team.

With the end of Group B, the Twin Cam Turbo engine became the engine (TA64) of the future Toyota Celica GT-Four, proving perfect for all-wheel drive used since 1987.

Results

Wins in the WRC

1983 15ème Rallye Marlboro Côte d'Ivoire (Björn Waldegård/Hans Thorszelius)
1984 32nd Marlboro Safari Rally (Björn Waldegård/Hans Thorszelius)
1985 33nd Marlboro Safari Rally and 17ème Rallye Marlboro Côte d'Ivoire (both Juha Kankkunen/Fred Gallagher)
1986 34nd Marlboro Safari Rally and 18ème Rallye Marlboro Côte d'Ivoire (both Björn Waldegård/Fred Gallagher)

References

Toyota racing cars
Rear-wheel-drive vehicles
Group B cars
Rally cars
Cars introduced in 1983
1980s cars
Cars of Japan